Svea (minor planet designation: 329 Svea) is an asteroid from the asteroid belt and the namesake of the small Svea family, approximately  in diameter. The C-type asteroid and is probably composed of carbonaceous material.

It was discovered by Max Wolf on 21 March 1892 in Heidelberg.

References

External links 
 
 

000329
Discoveries by Max Wolf
Named minor planets
000329
18920321